Arab City Melaka was a commercial development project in Malacca Island, Malacca, Malaysia. It was a joint venture between Golden Corporate Heritage Sdn Bhd (GCH)  and Malacca's state company. The project, considered "the first ever in the world", were billed at RM 1 Billion but has since been placed on hold. 

Initially, the project was planned to be situated in Jalan Ampang, Kuala Lumpur in 2007. However, an attractive offer from Malacca's Chief Minister led to the project to be moved to the state. According to the President of GCH, Sheikh Saleh Al Mansour said that the project is already marketed in 20 countries Arab. To begin with, GCH has released an initial investment of RM 400 million. The project was planned to open up job opportunities for 800 people. Local employees, who will make up 75 percent of the staff at the Arab city, will receive a seven-month training course on Arab language and culture to enable impeccable service to Arab and non tourists. The project started in January 2009 and is scheduled for completion in 2012. However, it was abandoned and the launch never took place.

In 2015, Malacca Chief Minister, Idris Haron said that the state's government have established a special steering committee led by the state secretary, seeking to revive the project.

The project would have been done in three separate areas. First phase would have been built on Malacca Island, with area as large as 1.7 hectare, used for the development of a three-storey shopping complex including an Arabian bazaar, Middle Eastern restaurants and cafes and a unisex Arabic health and beauty spa. The second phase would have been done in Klebang where it will have a five-star hotel, a water theme park, an aquarium and a floating restaurant. An Arab Village would have been constructed at Kampung Jawa as part of the third phase of the project.

See also
 Malacca Island
 Melaka Gateway

References

External links
Arab City Melaka Official Facebook
Arab City Melaka Official Twitter

Malacca City